The Cornish Times is a weekly newspaper, published every Friday from offices in Liskeard, Cornwall, United Kingdom. The offices are currently based in the former  Webb's  Hotel building (now called Webb's House). It covers all of South East Cornwall, including Callington, Fowey, Liskeard, Looe, Saltash and Torpoint. It has the image of a chough as an emblem on its front page. It is owned by the Tindle Newspaper Group.

History

The Cornish Times was first published on Saturday 3 January 1857. A complete set of microfilm copies of The Cornish Times can be examined at the Cornish Studies Centre in Redruth.  Cover price of the first edition was one old penny. Unlike today, it covered local and national as well as international news. Articles in the first edition included:
St. Petersburg, Russia, on a convention of Russia and Persia.
Copper ores for sale in Redruth
Mining information and activity around all of Cornwall
The address of the President of the United States
Crime in Tyne and Wear, England
The state of Nicaragua
Details of the execution of child murderer William Jackson, of Chester, England.

The first publishers were E. Philp of Callington and J. Philp of Liskeard.

Webb's Hotel
The current office building was built in 1833 as a hotel. The hotel was used for meetings of South Caradon Mine. Under Cornish Stannary Laws cost book system, two monthly meetings were held at which the purser presented the accounts. The result of the meeting was the owners sharing the profits or meeting any debts, the 'calls'. The owners' names were held in 'cost books', from which their entry could be deleted after settling outstanding calls. The system existed until 1883. The hotel has featured in royal visits, parliamentary declarations and much more but was recently converted into flats and offices.

The hotel is a Grade II listed building. It was abandoned and derelict in 1989, but a property developer purchased it in 2001 with plans to return it to its original state. It was reopened in 2005 to great local acclaim. As it is no longer a hotel, the building was renamed Webb's House. The area in front of the building has also been re-landscaped with granite seating, flower borders and a Celtic cross.

References

External links

Cornish Times website

Newspapers published in Cornwall